Neuville-sur-Saône (literally Neuville on Saône) is a commune in the Metropolis of Lyon in Auvergne-Rhône-Alpes region in eastern France.

Surrounding communes

 Genay
 Montanay
 Fleurieu-sur-Saône
 Albigny-sur-Saône

Population

Notable people
 Jacques Chauviré, physician and novelist
 Adrien Ducrot et Ambroise Pauffert, designers, benefactors of the commune
 Émile Guimet, industrialist, benefactor of the commune.
 André Latreille, lecturer and historian.
 Auguste et Louis Lumière, designer of the cinematograph.
 Camille de Neufville de Villeroy, archbishop of Lyons.
 Antoine-Michel Perrache, engineer and artist.
 Marie-Thérèse Prost, pharmacist, founder of the N'Den leper colony (Cameroun).
 Gabriel et Jacques Voisin, plane and car makers.

Gallery

See also
Communes of the Metropolis of Lyon

References

External links

Official site

Communes of Lyon Metropolis